John Ball (1744 – 24 August 1813) was an Irish barrister and politician.

Ball was educated at Trinity College, Dublin. From 1796 to 1800, he was MP for Drogheda in the Irish House of Commons. Ball pleaded without success against the union in parliament and was seen as one of most able lawyers of his day.

References

Alumni of Trinity College Dublin
18th-century Irish people
Irish MPs 1790–1797
Irish MPs 1798–1800
Members of the Parliament of Ireland (pre-1801) for County Louth constituencies